The Texas Travesty is a student-produced satirical newspaper created and produced at the University of Texas at Austin.

The Travesty began in 1997 as an independent, online-only publication by the Butler brothers: Kevin Butler (a former editorial columnist for The Daily Texan) and Brad Butler. Within a year, the publication successfully appealed for inclusion within Texas Student Media (TSM, officially named Texas Student Publications), an auxiliary enterprise of the university which publishes The Daily Texan and produces KVRX and TSTV.

The staff produces six issues each school year, three each long semester. According to the TSM itself, the Travesty currently has a print distribution of roughly 25,000 copies, in addition to thousands of online readers. The Travesty is supported by advertising revenue. As a publication within TSM, the paper shares some revenue and expenses with the general TSM organization. The editor-in-chief holds a non-voting position on the TSM board of directors.

Several of the Travestys writers and editors went on to publish That Other Paper, a once-popular but now-defunct alternative weekly in Austin, Texas.

Awards
Austin Chronicle — Best of Austin
2014: Best Local Publication (Readers' Poll)
2010: Best Local Publication (Readers' Poll)
2009: Best Local Publication (Readers' Poll)
2006: Best Local Publication (Readers' Poll)
2005: Best Local Publication (Readers' Poll)
2004: Best Local Publication (Readers' Poll)
2003: Best Parody Newspaper (Critics' Choice)

Editors-in-chief
Parker Howard (Summer 2022–Present)
Celeste Loren Ramirez (Summer 2021–Summer 2022)
William Joseph Tabor (Summer 2020–Summer 2021)
Arvind Ashok (Fall 2019–Summer 2020)
Virginia Beshears (Fall 2018–Spring 2019)
David Higbee Williams (Spring 2018)
Cole Gerthoffer (Fall 2017)
Grace Gilker and Cole Gerthoffer (Fall 2016–Spring 2017)
Joshua Brenner (Fall 2015–Summer 2016)
Chris Gilman (Fall 2014–Summer 2015 )
Nick Mehendale (Fall 2013–Summer 2014)
Katherine Swope (Summer 2012–Summer/Fall 2013)
David McQuary (Summer 2011–Summer 2012)
Alyssa Peters (Summer 2010–Summer 2011)
Matt Ingebretson (Summer 2009–Summer 2010)
Ross Luippold (Summer 2008–Summer 2009)
Veronica Hansen (Summer 2007–Spring 2008)
David Strauss (Summer 2006–Spring 2007)
Kristin Hillery (Summer 2005–Spring 2006)
Todd Ross Nienkerk (Summer 2003–Spring 2005)
Trevor Rosen (Summer 2001–Spring 2003)
Ben Stroud (Summer 2000–Spring 2001)
Brad Butler (Spring 1998–Spring 2000)
Kevin Butler (Spring 1997–Fall 1998)

See also 
 The Texas Ranger

References

External links
 
 Texas Travesty Archives (pre-2006 content)

1997 establishments in Texas
College humor magazines
Magazines established in 1997
Magazines published in Austin, Texas
Satirical magazines published in the United States
Student magazines published in the United States
Texas Student Media